A product line extension is the use of an established product brand name for a new item in the same product category.

Overview 
Line extensions occur when a company introduces additional items in the same product category under the same brand name such as new flavors, forms, colors, added ingredients, package sizes.  This is as opposed to brand extension which is a new product in a totally different product category. Line extension occurs when the company lengthens its product line beyond its current range. The company can extend its product line down-market stretch, up-market stretch, or both ways.

Product line extensions are a process where companies with an established brand alter the factors of a product or products to satisfy a refined segment in the market. There are two types of product line extensions, horizontal and vertical. Horizontal extensions consist of keeping the price and quality consistent, but changing factors like flavour or colour to differentiate the products. Vertical extensions consist of increasing and decreasing the quality and price to create inferior and luxury goods. These product line extensions are often closely related to existing products in a brands portfolio, but targets specific brand consumers through this approach.

Product line extensions help companies identify and tend to the needs of refined target markets. If applied appropriately, their advantage within the intended market is endless.

Practically, when brands apply a product extension strategy they can often benefit from the new addition or additions. This is as extending their product line enlarges their product portfolio and as a result provides the consumers with more variety to choose from. This is positive, as consumers tend to enjoy being able to have choice and through expanding a brands product line, the brand is providing this choice.

Investing in this approach is commonly pursued by companies due to their desire to create revenue and to advance their competitive status against rival companies. The advantages when undergoing product line extensions is that the new product or products are commonly closely related to existing products, so the company often has the appropriate production process and capacity to produce the new product or products.

Issues facing product line extensions can include company's investments in the new products without the desired return. The product may come at a loss or may not be able to make enough of the return the company was forecasting for. The new addition could also send confusion to the company's customer base, and in turn negatively affect the loyalty they have for the brand. This can evidently become a long-term risk in terms of brand image, as consumers may have a new view of the brand as cheap, in the case of downward extension, or unrealistic and unreasonable in terms of upward extension.  An issue also connected to the extensions, could result in the production process becoming more and more complicated as a result of new products, this could affect the company's efficiency and quality in the production of the brands product range.

An advantage of extending company product lines is the likely rise in sales, demand and market share. Product line extension increases the amount of different products available to consumers, and through adding more products into the market it keeps consumers interested. This can be helpful in avoiding customer base loss.

Down-market stretch
A company positioned in the middle market may want to introduce a lower-priced line for any of the 3 reasons

 The company may notice strong growth opportunities as mass retailers such as Wal-Mart, Best Buy, and others attract a growing number of shoppers who want value-priced goods.
 The company may wish to tie up lower-end competitors who might otherwise try to move up-market. If the company has been attacked by a low-end competitor, it often decides to counterattack by entering the low end of the market.
 The company may find that the middle market is stagnating or declining.

An advantage to downward product line extension is it creates more competition between brands. This can be good for the consumer as product prices may become more competitive, and goods may become cheaper to purchase. Increased competition generated from the extension allows the brand to gain more market share over their competitors. The brand can also benefit from an increase in exposure through this competitive process.

Brand image is a big contributing factor when it comes to product line extension. Within downward extension it can make the brand seem less luxurious, cheap, basic, and inconsistent. In a study, the results revealed when high status brands downward extend their product line, consumers feel a sense of dishonesty and untrustworthy towards the brands image. This is as a result of luxury brands having a stereotype of being exclusive and high quality, and with the addition of a lower quality, cheaper product the consumers perceive this as a breach.

When extending the product line downward, the new product or products become more available to consumers and most likely, cheaper. With this product volume and price, a less-luxurious image can 
be formed around the brand by consumers. This can either be a positive or negative impact on the brand depending on which industry and market the brand is a part of. For example, Walmart is widely known for its low prices and availability, so this consumer image of the brand would not impact the company negatively. Whereas, if Prada were to start selling a downward product line of low quality, low priced goods this would impact the brand's high status, exclusivity and luxurious image negatively.

However, when introducing downward line extensions, consumers may be opted to by this cheaper option the brand is providing rather than their upward line extension goods. This introduction may negatively affect the sales of their premium and more luxury goods. So while demand and increased market share may be a positive to downward line extensions, the approach may disadvantage the brands overall profit.

Up-market stretch
Companies may wish to enter the high end of the market for more growth, target returning customers, higher margins, or simply to position themselves as full-line manufacturers. Many markets have spawned surprising upscale segments: Starbucks in coffee, Häagen-Dazs in ice cream and Evian in bottled water. Leading Japanese auto companies have each introduced an upscale automobile: Toyota's Lexus, Nissan's Infiniti, and Honda's Acura. Note that they invented entirely new names rather than using or including their own names.

Brands extending their product lines upward successfully can benefit through the increasing amount of middle-class consumers that are becoming more capable and willing to invest their money in luxury products. Brands can adjust pricing to coincide with trends within the economy, to ensure the luxury goods do not lose too much of their consumer demand within their most popular market segments.

Upward product line extension can advantage the brand through associating the new luxury product addition with the existing brand name. Additional high quality, high priced products can improve the image of the brand and create a new outlook within the consumer market through consumers associating the brand with its more exclusive and elite products. This can help with sales and demand if the luxury goods become quite popular and favourable.

However, cheaper products may draw attention and demand away from a brands upward product line extension. A way to combat this is to increase the quality of the brands luxury goods, as well as targeting aspects of the consumer market that are able and prepared to pay more for the higher quality product.

Two-way stretch
Companies serving the middle market might decide to stretch their line in both directions. Texas Instruments (TI) introduced its first calculators in the medium-price-medium-quality end of the market. Gradually, it added calculators at the lower end taking the share from Bowmar, and at the higher end to compete with Hewlett-Packard. This two-way stretch won Texas Instruments (TI) an early market leadership in the hand-calculator market.

Examples include
 Zen LXI, Zen VXI
 Surf, Surf Excel, Surf Excel Blue
 Splendour, Splendour Plus
 Coca-Cola, Diet Coke, Vanilla Coke
 Clinic All Clear, Clinic Plus
 Reese's Peanut Butter Cups, Reese's Pieces and Reese's Puff Cereal

See also
Brand
Brand management
Marketing
Product management
Product lining

References

Brand management
Product development
Product management